Akkur is a village in the Indian state of Tamil Nadu. It is located 20 km from Kanchipuram. 

Akkur is home to the thirukanneeshwarar  udanurai thirupura sundari temple of lord shiva. The temple is approximately 1000 years old & Ambujavalli Nayikaa Samedha Lakshmi Narayana Temple. The temple is approximately 700 years old, and is dedicated to Lord Vishnu. The temple was renovated in 2003 and a mahasamprokshanam was conducted.

References

Villages in Tiruvannamalai district
Tiruvannamalai district
Cities and towns in Tiruvannamalai district